Hercules Transit Center is a major commuter hub in the western Contra Costa County city of 
Hercules, California. It is anchored by WestCAT bus services. The center was originally on San Pablo Avenue. In August 2009, the transit center was relocated to the other side of I-80 with additional paid parking. 

The transit center is a pulse (a timed and synchronized) transfer point for various local feeder bus lines from the adjacent areas of Hercules, Pinole, Rodeo, the northern Hilltop area of Richmond, Bayview-Montalvin, and Tara Hills.

The feeder services feed express commuter bus service to El Cerrito del Norte BART station in El Cerrito, downtown Martinez (the county seat) and Martinez Amtrak station. These services provide transfers to AC Transit at Richmond Parkway Transit Center, shopping areas at Hilltop Mall Shopping Center and Pinole Vista Shopping Center and transbay service to the San Francisco Transbay Terminal.

The westbound weekday morning commute from this point south towards the San Francisco–Oakland Bay Bridge is the most congested in the San Francisco Bay Area since 2001 according to Caltrans.

Studies have been concluded as to the feasibility of running BART service to the Transit Center.

Bus service
The following bus services stop at the center:

WestCAT
10 Gems and Birds: Hercules
11 Crockett/Rodeo: Crockett via Rodeo
12 Trees and Flowers: Hercules
15 Viewpointe: Rodeo
19 Hilltop/Hercules: The Shops at Hilltop (Saturday service only)
30Z Martinez Link: Martinez Station
C3 Contra Costa College
Dial-a-ride General public dial-a-ride and paratransit service
J Hercules/BART: El Cerrito del Norte Station
JPX Hercules/BART: El Cerrito del Norte Station via Pinole Valley Road
JX Hercules/BART: El Cerrito del Norte Station Non-Stop Express
Lynx: San Francisco Transbay Terminal

References

External links 
Map: 
Transit and parking information at Transit Unlimited
Parking permit sales

Hercules, California
Bus stations in Contra Costa County, California